Salang mountains are found in Parwan Province and Baghlan Province in northeastern Afghanistan.

These mountains lie in between the cities of Charikar in the south and Baghlan in the north.

References

External links
Satellite map at Maplandia.com

Mountain ranges of Afghanistan
Landforms of Parwan Province
Landforms of Baghlan Province